Johnathan "John" McTurk (born 11 July 1936) is a Scottish former footballer, who played as a defender.

Career

McTurk began his career at St Mirren before being called up to serve with the Royal Engineers.

He would be loaned out to Welsh club Wrexham during his time at the club, which would fly him in for matches from Fleet. He also played for the Army Team during his time with St Mirren.

After his time at St Mirren, he would enjoy spells at Scottish clubs Queen of the South, Ayr United, Greenock Morton, Stirling Albion and Albion Rovers.

References

1936 births
Living people
Scottish footballers
English Football League players
St Mirren F.C. players
Wrexham A.F.C. players
Queen of the South F.C. players
Ayr United F.C. players
Greenock Morton F.C. players
Stirling Albion F.C. players
Albion Rovers F.C. players
Association football defenders
Scottish Junior Football Association players
Auchinleck Talbot F.C. players
Footballers from East Ayrshire